Suzie Terry (formerly Suzie Opacic) is an English snooker player. She won the 2006 World Ladies Junior Championship and is an active player on the women's professional snooker circuit, who has reached the semi-finals of several ranking tournaments.

Biography
Terry is from Eastleigh and started playing snooker at the age of eight, after watching it on television. She was playing on full-sized tables by the age of nine.

She joined the women's snooker circuit in 2006, aged 17-year-old in her first year, she won the World Ladies Junior Championship, and by 2009 had reached four semi-finals – two each UK Women's Championship (2006 and 2007) and the Ladies British Open (2007 and 2009). Terry attended Bournemouth University, studying geography. In 2006, at the age of 18, and having already won the Junior Championship, she was unable to represent her league team when they had a match against Netley Central social club, as women were not allowed to play there. Eight months later, the Club overturned its ban on women playing.

Terry took a break of four years from competition, mainly due to studying for a Master's degree, but also from disillusionment with the reduced number of tournaments and players. She returned to competitive snooker in 2015.

With her playing partner Laura Evans, Opacic was a runner-up in the Women's Pairs Championship in both 2017 and 2018.

Terry's main career is as a Planning Manager. She was a town planner in Heathrow Airport's Expansion team, working on obtaining planning approvals for the proposed new runway and related developments.

Titles and achievements
2006 World Ladies Junior Championship winner
2006 UK Women's Championship semi-finalist 
2007 UK Women's Championship semi-finalist
2007 Ladies British Open semi-finalist
2009 Ladies British Open semi-finalist
2016 Connie Gough Trophy semi-finalist
2017 LITEtask World Women's 10-Red Championship semi-finalist
2017 Women's Pairs Championship runner-up (with Laura Evans)
2018 Eden Women's Masters semi-finalist
2018 Women's Pairs Championship runner-up (with Laura Evans)

References

External links
EPSB – Your Cue To Play with Suzie Opacic Nine-second video
Suzie Opacic vs Jaique Ip 2018 World Women's Snooker Championship

Living people
1988 births
English snooker players
Female snooker players
People from Eastleigh
Alumni of Bournemouth University